Communal dining is the practice of dining with others. The practice is centered on food and sharing time with the people who come together in order to share the meal and conversation. Communal dining can take place in public establishments like restaurants, college cafeterias, or in private establishments (home).

History 
Communal dining was an important part of ancient Rome's religious traditions.

There is a mention of communal dining in Chinese history.

References 

Restaurant design
Eating behaviors of humans
Food and drink culture